Nick Foot is an Australian rules football Umpire currently officiating in the Australian Football League (AFL).

Umpiring career
Foot began umpiring as a 13-year-old.

In 2010, Nick won the AFL/Australian Sports Commission All Australian Umpire. As the winner of this award he travelled with the Australian Under 18 squad to officiate their games in Italy, Turkey and the United Kingdom. The highlight of the trip was the game against the European Under 18 team. Nick also attended the ANZAC Day service at Gallipoli, Turkey.

In 2010, after the trip, Nick realised that he needed to work harder to continue on track to the AFL. He started to increase his training regime. To make the AFL panel, his coach needed to video the game and send it to Melbourne, where the AFL umpiring department would decide if he was good enough to make the cut.

He followed up his 2009 grand final appearance with appointments to the 2010 and 2011 Tasmanian State League grand finals. He spent 2011 as an AFL rookie umpire, officiating in matches in the NAB Cup. In 2012 he was elevated to the full AFL list.

References

Living people
Australian Football League umpires
Year of birth missing (living people)